Ar Rakiyat is a village in Qatar, located in the municipality of Ash Shamal. From the 19th to 20th centuries, the village obtained its water supply from the freshwater well in Ar Rakiyat Fort. The fort also provided refuge for its population in times of conflict.

Etymology
Ar Rakiyat is an Arabic term used to denote a low area that has been excavated, typically for a well. It was named this in reference to the well in Ar Rakiyat Fort.

History
In J. G. Lorimer's Gazetteer of the Persian Gulf, Ar Rakiyat is described as a settlement 5 miles northwest of Zubarah and which is characterized by its ruined fort. Nearby abandoned settlements include Al Khuwayr, Al `Arish, Freiha and Ain Mohammed.

Gallery

References

Populated places in Al Shamal